Although the Maronite flag is believed to have been created in the 17th or 18th century, its first recorded use was in October 1848. The flag was also raised as the first national flag of Lebanon on October 2, 1918, following the fall of the Ottoman Empire.

Background
The 1918 version of the flag was created by two Lebanese Brazilian journalists, Shukri El Khoury and Naoum Labaki, who were both part of the Mahjar movement in the Americas. The flag was raised on October 2, 1918, following the expulsion of Ottoman troops from Mount Lebanon and was hung in the Administrative Council (Majlis) of Mount Lebanon until 1920 when the flag and government were succeeded by the state of Greater Lebanon.

The flag was also used by the second Lebanese delegation to the Paris Peace Conference, led by the Maronite patriarch Elias Peter Hoayek, to petition for an independent Lebanese state separate from the Arab kingdom of Faisal I.

Symbolism
The flag has a simple design with two main features:

The white background represents the snow of Mount Lebanon as a symbol of purity and peace.
The cedar is based on the national symbol of Lebanon, the Cedrus libani. The cedars of Lebanon are mentioned seventy-seven times in the Bible, especially in the book of Psalms, chapter 92, verse 13, where it says that "The righteous shall flourish like the palm tree, He shall grow like a cedar in Lebanon" and chapter 104, verse 16, where it is stated: "[t]he trees of the Lord are well watered, the cedars of Lebanon that he planted".

Gallery

See also
 Maronites
 Flag of Lebanon
 Lebanese nationalism

References

Further reading
Joseph Nehmé, 1995: Le drapeau libanais: A Travers les Siècles, Dayr al-Qumr (Lebanon) (in French and Arabic)

Flags introduced in 1848
Flags introduced in 1918
National symbols of Lebanon
Flags of Asia
Ethnic flags
Flag